Next Generation corvette (NGC) are a planned class of anti-surface warfare corvettes for the Indian Navy. Under this programme, the Indian Navy intends to acquire seven advanced ships armed with anti-ship or Land-attack missiles like BrahMos. Ships in this class will feature advanced stealth features like a low radar cross section (RCS), infrared, acoustic and magnetic signatures.

References

Corvette classes
Corvettes of the Indian Navy